Fontes is a civil parish in the municipality of Santa Marta de Penaguião, in the northern Douro region of Portugal. The population in 2011 was 835, in an area of 15.67 km².

History
An old parish, its history dates to a period when a vicarage under the Commander of Comenda and Order of Malta dominated the region. For most of its early history it fell under the dominion of the vicarage, until it much later become its own independent rectory.

Most of the parish's territory, from the chapel of São Pedro to the settlement of Crestelo, was once a primitive Castro, which suffered from later Roman colonization. The more celebrated reference of this period, was a Greco-Roman altar stone with an inscription in Latin: AUGE CILEAE MINIME VOT.L.PO.

The parish received a foral (charter) from King Sancho I of Portugal in August 1202, and later from King Afonso III of Portugal, in July 1218. King Manuel of Portugal issued a later foral on 15 December 1514, while staying in Évora, which raised the settlement status to town and municipal seat. This state lasted until the Liberal reforms of 1836.

Owing to local tradition, the chapel of the Sanctuary of Nossa Senhora do Viso, was the first parochial church raised in the parish. As documented by friar Agostinho de Santa Maria in 1716 (5 tome of his Santuário Mariano): 
This temple to Our Lady, being grande and spacious, is quite perfect, not just in architecture, but also in its ornamentation: everything is covered in azulejo tile and the roof is panelled in rich paintings from the mysteries of Our Lady.

Geography
Fontes is the largest territorial parish in the municipality, located eight kilometres north of the municipal seat. The parish contains the localities Crestêlo, Fontes, Justos, Póvoa da Serra, Soutelo and Tabuadelo.

Architecture

Civic
 Estate of Souto
 Primary School of Fontes

Religious
 Chapel of Livração
 Chapel of Nossa Senhora da Piedade
 Chapel of Nossa Senhora de Fátima
 Chapel of Nossa Senhora de Monserrate
 Chapel of Nossa Senhora dos Milagres
 Chapel of Santa Maria Madalena
 Chapel of Santa Quitéria
 Chapel of Santo António
 Chapel of Santo Espírito
 Chapel of São Pedro
 Chapel of São Sebastião
 Chapel of Senhora da Saude
 Chapel of Senhora do Viso
 Church of Santiago
 Cross of Senhor dos Aflitos
 Cross of Senhor do Cruzeiro e Alminhas

References

Freguesias of Santa Marta de Penaguião